Lycée Léonard de Vinci may refer to:

Schools in the Paris area:
 Istituto Statale Italiano Leonardo Da Vinci (Lycée italien Leonardo da Vinci) in Paris
 Lycée des Métiers du Bois Léonard de Vinci in Paris
  Lycée professionnel Léonard-de-Vinci in Bagneaux, Hauts-de-Seine
 Lycée Léonard de Vinci in Levallois-Perret
 Lycée Léonard de Vinci in Melun
 Lycée Léonard de Vinci in Saint-Michel-sur-Orge
Lycée Léonard de Vinci in Saint-Witz
Lycée Léonard de Vinci in Tremblay-en-France

Schools in other parts of France:
 Lycée Léonard de Vinci in Amboise
 Lycée Léonard de Vinci in Antibes
 Lycée Léonard de Vinci in Blanquefort, Gironde
 Lycée Léonard de Vinci in Calais
 Lycée Professionnel Léonard de Vinci in Marseille
 Lycée public Léonard de Vinci – Monistrol-sur-Loire
 Lycée Léonard de Vinci in Montaigu, Vendée
 Lycée des Métiers de l'Eco-Construction et du Bâtiment Léonard de Vinci in Montpellier
 Lycée Professionnel Léonard de Vinci in Nantes
 Lycée Léonard de Vinci in Soissons
 Lycée Léonard de Vinci in Villefontaine